Newport High School is a public high school located in Newport, Oregon, United States. It is one of five high schools in the Lincoln County School District. As of 2008, the school offers the International Baccalaureate Diploma Programme.

Academics
In 2008, 67% of the school's seniors received a high school diploma. Of 211 students, 141 graduated, 44 dropped out, five received a modified diploma, and 21 were still in high school in 2009.

Newport also offers a teen parent program, which provides child care for children of high school students while they continue to attend school.

Sports

State champions

Team
 Cheerleading: 2005 (Division 3A Large), 2006 (Division 3A Large), 2019 (4A/3A/2A/1A)
 Baseball: 1964 (Class A-2), 1965 (Class A-2), 1967 (Class A-2), 1974 (Class AA), 2008 (Class 4A)
 Girls' track & field: 2011 (Class 4A)
 Boys' track & field: 2019 (Class 4A)
 Girls' basketball: 1978 (Class AA)
 Boys' soccer: 2016, 2017(Class 4A)
 Boys' Swimming 2018, 2019, 2020 4A/3A/2A/1A

Runner-up
 Football: 1969 (Class A-2)
 Boys' basketball: 1959 (Class A-2)
 Girls' basketball: 1982 (Class AA)
 Boys' swimming: 2005 (Class 3A/2A/1A), 2013 (Class 4A/3A/2A/1A), 2014 (Class 4A/3A/2A/1A)
 Baseball: 1975 (Class AA), 1986 (Class AA), 2007 (Class 4A)
 Softball: 1995 (Class 3A), 2001 (Class 3A)
 Cheerleading: 2000 (Class 3A/2A/1A Coed), 2002 (Class 3A), 2003 (Class 3A Large), 2004 (Class 3A), 2007 (4A Small)

Individual
 Boys' cross country individual: 1996 (Class 3A) - Rhy Reynolds, 15:37, 5000 meters
 Girls' cross country individual: 1996 (Class 3A) -  Melinda Campbell, 18:50, 5000 meters
 Boys' swimming individual:
 1952 - Diving: Bill Dixon
 1998 - 100-Yard Breaststroke: Scott Cole, 1:01.92
 2004 - 200-Yard Freestyle Relay: David Morley, Casey Teague, Dustin Capri, and Michael Mpitsos - 1:33.30
 2005 - 200-Yard Freestyle Relay: Morley, Teague, Capri, and Mpitsos - 1:33.19
 2006 - 100-Yard Backstroke: Michael Mpitsos, 54.01
 2007 (Class 4A)
 100 fly: Michael Mpitsos, 51.87
 100 back: Michael Mpitsos, 53.59
 2011 (Class 4A)
 200 Medley relay: Austin Turner, Tom Graves, Clayton Jacobson, Kellen Wood - 1:42.11
 2013 (Class 4A)
 200 yard Individual Medley: Austin Turner- 1:58.59
 100 yard backstroke: Austin Turner- 53.77
 100 yard freestyle: Kellen Wood- 48.69
 200 yard freestyle relay: Austin Thompson, Tanner Schipper, Kellen Wood and Austin Turner- 1:31.91
 400 yard freestyle relay: Austin Thompson, Tanner Schipper, Kellen Wood and Austin Turner- 3:21.47
 OSAA Male Swimmer of the Meet- Austin Turner (2013)
 2014 (Class 4A)
 100 yard butterfly: Austin Turner- 51.83
 100 yard freestyle: Tanner Schipper- 49.98
 200 yard freestyle relay: Austin Thompson, Leland Wood, Tanner Schipper, Austin Turner- 1:32.46
 100 yard backstroke: Austin Turner- 53.03
2018 (Class 4A)
200 Yard Medley Relay: Caden Shanks, Kai Daniels, Nick Topar and Sean O'Meara- 1:40.73
400 yard Freestyle Relay: Lucas Ellingson-Cosenza, Luke Bachart, Caden Shanks and Sean O'Meara- 3:19.46
500 Yard Freestyle: Lucas Ellingson-Cosenza- 4:44.27 
 Girls' swimming individual:
 1971: Diving: "Dede" Deidra Cherzan, 381.03
 1972: Diving: "Dede" Deidra Cherzan, 385.85
 2000: 200-Yard Individual Medley: Katie Chapman, 2:11.87
 2001
 200-Yard Freestyle: Katie Chapman, 1:56.17
 500-Yard Freestyle: Katie Chapman, 5:11.68
 2002
 100-Yard Butterfly: Katie Chapman, 58.99
 100-Yard Backstroke: Katie Chapman, 1:01.64
 Wrestling individual:
 1999: 145 pounds: Jake Albinio
 2005: 215 pounds: Paul Collins
 Girls' golf individual: 2008 (4A/3A/2A/1A) - Kate Bigelow, (TIE) 76-77 – 153 (+9)
 Boys' and girls' track & field individual: many

League champions
 Baseball: 1956, 1957, 1958, 1959, 1963, 1964, 1965, 1966, 1967, 1971, 1973, 1974, 1975, 1976, 1977, 1979, 1980, 1982, 1983, 1984, 1985, 1986, 1987, 1991, 1992, 1994, 1995, 1996, 1997, 2004, 2006, 2007, 2008, 2009, 2010, 2011, 2015, 2019
 Boys' basketball: 1955, 1956, 1958, 1959, 1967, 1975, 1977, 1997, 1999, 2003, 2018
 Girls' basketball: 1977, 1978, 1980, 1982, 2007, 2008
 Boys’ soccer: 2016
 Boys' cross country: 1995, 1996, 2011
 Girls' cross country: 2006
 Football: 1955, 1957, 1958, 1960, 1963, 1964, 1965, 1966, 1967, 1968, 1969, 1970, 1971, 1974, 1978, 1979, 1980, 1982, 1984, 1985, 1990, 1991, 1997, 2001, 2002, 2006
 Girls' golf: 1994, 1995, 1997, 2001, 2002, 2006, 2009 (co-champion)
 Boys' swimming: 1996, 1997, 2012, 2013, 2014, 2015, 2016, 2017, 2018, 2019, 2020
 Girls' swimming: 1971, 1972, 1975, 1976, 1979, 1989, 2001, 2020
 Boys' track & field: 1952, 1956, 1997, 2002, 2005, 2006, 2007, 2017, 2018
 Girls' track & field: 2003, 2004, 2005, 2006, 2007, 2011

Notable alumni
 Nathan Ball, host of the PBS Kids show Design Squad
 Brent Barton, Oregon House of Representatives, District 51
 Jamie Kovac, 'Fury' of American Gladiators
 Randall Woodfield, the I-5 Killer

References 

1951 establishments in Oregon
Educational institutions established in 1951
Newport, Oregon
International Baccalaureate schools in Oregon
High schools in Lincoln County, Oregon
Public high schools in Oregon